The Sons of Mistletoe is a Christmas drama television film that aired on CBS on December 19, 2001. A co-production of Canada and the United States, the film was directed by Steven Robman and written by Darrah Cloud. It stars Roma Downey, George Newbern, Scott Terra, Cathy Lee Crosby, and Doris Roberts.

Plot
A cold businesswoman threatens to close a boys foster home during the holidays when she returns to her home town to settle her late father's estate.

Cast
 Roma Downey as Helen Radke
 George Newbern as Jimmy Adams
 Scott Terra as Wylie Armstrong
 Cathy Lee Crosby as Mary
 Doris Roberts as Margie
 Adam Schurman as Benny
 Mathew Peart as Howard
 Kit Weyman as Evan
 Austin Di Iulio as Alex
 Kyle Kass as Miguel
 Dylan Rosenthal as Victor
 Jack Jessop as Floyd

Awards and nominations

See also
 List of Christmas films

References

External links
 

2001 films
2001 drama films
2001 television films
2000s American films
2000s Canadian films
2000s children's drama films
2000s Christmas drama films
2000s English-language films
American children's drama films
American Christmas drama films
American drama television films
Canadian children's drama films
Canadian Christmas drama films
Canadian drama television films
CBS network films
Children's Christmas films
Christmas television films
Films about orphans
Films directed by Steven Robman
Films set in orphanages
Films shot in Toronto